Newtown Creek Bridge is a historic stone arch bridge located at Newtown, Bucks County, Pennsylvania.  It spans Newtown Creek. It has two spans, each are 15 feet long, and was constructed in 1796.  It was modified in 1875.

It was listed on the National Register of Historic Places in 1988.

Gallery

References 
 

Road bridges on the National Register of Historic Places in Pennsylvania
Bridges completed in 1796
Bridges in Bucks County, Pennsylvania
National Register of Historic Places in Bucks County, Pennsylvania
Stone arch bridges in the United States
1796 establishments in Pennsylvania